Milan Mišík (3 November 1928 in Skalica, Czechoslovakia – 7 May 2011 in Bratislava, Slovakia) was Slovak geologist and university professor. He excelled particularly as an expert in microfacies analysis, stratigraphy, sedimentology, petrography of sedimentary rocks, but also in paleogeography, general and structural geology and tectonics. His best known scientific works were dealing with carbonate rocks and exotic conglomerates.

Life 
Born into a family of teachers in Skalica (Western Slovakia) on 3 November 1928, he graduated from high school in Bratislava in 1947.  In 1951, he completed his studies in geology and geography at Comenius University, Faculty of Natural Sciences in Bratislava. He worked at the Department of Geology and paleontology from 19511960 as an assistant to professor Dimitrij Andrusov, and from 1960 to 1970 as an associated professor. From 19631965, Mišík taught at the University of Havana, and from 1966 to 1970, he served as the head of the Department of Geology and paleontology where he lectured on the regional Geology of the Western Carpathians, petrography of sedimentary rocks, geotectonics, historical geology and stratigraphy. In 1970 he obtained a doctoral degree and was appointed professor of geology. From 19811983 he taught geology at the Algerian University in Constantine. He contributed to the development of the Faculty of natural sciences of Comenius University and the development of teaching methodology, and participated in the preparation of geology experts and researchers. He was devoted to these research activities into high age and published his last monograph at the age of 81. He died on May 7, 2011 in Bratislava. His funeral took place on May 11 in the Bratislava crematorium Urnový háj.

Research interest 
His scientific research was focused on the microfacial and stratigraphic investigation of the Mesozoic rocks of Western Carpathians, sedimentary petrography of carbonate rocks and Mesozoic paleogeography. He published more than 130 scientific articles and 34 popular science articles. His best known works are the monographs on Microfacies of Mesozoic and Tertiary limestones of Western Carpathians (in English and Slovak) which met with a positive international response and laid the foundations of modern microfacial analysis in Slovakia. He was also the author of the guide Geological Excursion to Slovakia (1976) and an editor of the textbook Stratigraphical and historical geology (1985). He authored entry about the geology of Slovakia in Springer's Encyclopedia of European and Asian regional geology (1997). From 2003 to 2009, together with D. Reháková, he published a series of monographs about carbonate sedimentary rocks of the Western Carpathians. He was also an author of the popular science book Relay of science (1990) which was to bring scientific research to the general public.

During his scientific career he led numerous domestic scientific projects VEGA and KEGA. Also collaborated in international UNESCO IGCP projects.

Important papers 
Among the most important works of Milan Mišík these monographs are considered:
 Microfacies of the Mesozoic and Tertiary limestones of the West Carpathians. (1966)
 Geology of Czechoslovak Carpathians. In Geography of Czechoslovakia. Part I (in cooperation with Oto Fusán and Augustín Gorek, 1968)
 Geological Excursion to Slovakia. (1976)
 Stratigraphic and historical geology. (with Ivo Chlupáč and Ivan Cicha, 1985)
 Exotic conglomerates in flysch sequences: Examples from the West Carpathians. In: M. Rakús, J. Dercourt, A. R. M. Nairn (Editors): Evolution of the Northern margin of Tethys. (together with Róbert Marschalko, 1988)
 Relay of science. (1990)
 Slovakia. In: E. M. Moores and R. W. Fairbridge (Editors): Encyclopedia of European and Asian regional geology. (1997)
 Psefitic rocks (gravel, breccias, conglomerates) of the Western Carpathians. (with Daniela Reháková, 2004)
 Dolomites, dolomitizátion, dedolomitization in rocks of the Western Carpathians. (with Reháková, 2007)
 Limestones of Slovakia – Part I (bioherm, crinoidal, freshwater, ooidal and oncoidal limestones). (with Reháková, 2009)

References 

1928 births
2011 deaths
People from Skalica
Slovak geologists
Comenius University alumni